Techin Muktarakosa (born April 18, 1997) is a Thai professional footballer who plays as a defensive midfielder for Krabi in the Thai League 3.

Honours

Club
Krabi
 Thai League 3 runners-up: 2021–22
 Thai League 3 Southern Region: 2021–22

International
Thailand U-23
 AFF U-22 Youth Championship runner up: 2019

References

External links
 

1997 births
Living people
Techin Muktarakosa
Association football midfielders
Techin Muktarakosa
Techin Muktarakosa
Techin Muktarakosa
Techin Muktarakosa
Techin Muktarakosa
Techin Muktarakosa
Techin Muktarakosa